The Zeppelin-Staaken R.V  was one of a series of large bombers called Riesenflugzeugen, intended to be less vulnerable than the rigid airships in use at the time.

Development
In 1916, Zeppelin moved development of large bombers to Staaken, Germany. The R.V was co-developed alongside the R.VI and R.VII. The R.V had two engine pods, each with two engines paired in tandem, driving single propellers through clutches, gearboxes and shafts. An additional tractor engine was also fitted in the nose of the fuselage. The pods were large enough for some inflight maintenance. The Model R.IV was selected for production, rather than the R.V, because the geared and clutched engines posed a higher developmental risk. Each R-series aircraft required a ground-crew of 50.

Operational history
The sole R.V (R.V 13/15) was accepted into service with Rfa 501 (Riesenflugzeug Abteilung 501) on 23 December 1917, after a protracted development period, due to teething troubles with the engine transmission systems. After an initial operational mission on 25 January 1918, fifteen further operational missions were flown in eight months of service, before an emergency landing in fog ended its career on 18 October 1918.

Operators
 
 Rfa 501

Specifications (Zeppelin-Staaken R.V)

Notes

References

External links

Zeppelin-Staaken
1910s German bomber aircraft
Military aircraft of World War I
Five-engined push-pull aircraft
Biplanes
Aircraft first flown in 1917